Mara (or ; ; also マーラ, Māra or 天魔, Tenma; Tibetan Wylie: bdud; ; ;), in Buddhism, is a malignant celestial king who tried to stop Prince Siddhartha achieving Enlightenment by trying to seduce him with his celestial Army and the vision of beautiful women who, in various legends, are often said to be Mara's daughters.

In Buddhist cosmology, Mara is associated with death, rebirth and desire. Nyanaponika Thera has described Mara as "the personification of the forces antagonistic to enlightenment."

Etymology
The word Māra comes from the Sanskrit form of the verbal root mṛ. It takes a present indicative form mṛyate and a causative form mārayati (with strengthening of the root vowel from ṛ to ār). Māra is a verbal noun from the causative root and means 'causing death' or 'killing'. It is related to other words for death from the same root, such as: maraṇa and mṛtyu. The latter is a name for death personified and is sometimes identified with Yama.

The root mṛ is related to the Indo-European verbal root *mer meaning "die, disappear" in the context of "death, murder or destruction". It is "very wide-spread" in Indo-European languages suggesting it to be of great antiquity, according to Mallory and Adams.

Four types of Māra
In traditional Buddhism, four or five metaphorical forms of Māra are given:

 Kleśa-māra - Māra as the embodiment of all unskillful emotions, such as greed, hate and delusion.
 Mṛtyu-māra - Māra as death.
 Skandha-māra - Māra as metaphor for the entirety of conditioned existence.
 Devaputra-māra - the deva of the sensuous realm, who tried to prevent Gautama Buddha from attaining liberation from the cycle of rebirth on the night of the Buddha’s enlightenment.

Character
Early Buddhism acknowledged both a literal and psychological interpretation of Mara.

Mara is described both as an entity having an existence in Kāma-world, just as are shown existing around the Buddha, and also is described in pratītyasamutpāda as, primarily, the guardian of passion and the catalyst for lust, hesitation and fear that obstructs meditation among Buddhists. The Denkōroku refers to him as the "One Who Delights in Destruction", which highlights his nature as a deity among the Parinirmitavaśavarti devas.

"Buddha defying Mara" is a common pose of Buddha sculptures. The Buddha is shown with his left hand in his lap, palm facing upwards and his right hand on his right knee. The fingers of his right hand touch the earth, to call the earth as his witness for defying Mara and achieving enlightenment. This posture is also referred to as the bhūmisparśa "earth-witness" mudra.

Three daughters
In some accounts of the Buddha's enlightenment, it is said that the demon Māra did not send his three daughters to tempt but instead they came willingly after Māra's setback in his endeavor to eliminate the Buddha's quest for enlightenment. For example, in the Samyutta Nikaya's Māra-sayutta, Mara's three daughters were stripping in front of Buddha; but failed to entice the Buddha:
They had come to him glittering with beauty –
Taṇhā, Arati, and Rāga –
But the Teacher swept them away right there
As the wind, a fallen cotton tuft.

Some stories refer to the existence of Five Daughters, who represent not only the Three Poisons of Attraction, Aversion, and Delusion, but also include the daughters Pride, and Fear.

Mara's conversion
The Jingde Record of the Transmission of the Lamp and the Denkoroku both contain a story of Mara's conversion to Buddhism under the auspices of the monk Upagupta.

According to the story, Upagupta journeyed to the kingdom of Mathura and preached the Dharma with great success. This caused Mara's palace to tremble, prompting the deity to use his destructive powers against the Dharma. When Upagupta entered samadhi, Mara approached him and slipped a jade necklace around his neck.

Upagupta reciprocated by transforming the corpses of a man, a dog, and a snake into a garland and gifted it to Mara. When Mara discovered the true nature of the gift, he sought the help of Brahma to remove it. Brahma informed him that because the necklace was bestowed by an advanced disciple of the Buddha, its effects could only be assuaged by taking refuge in Upagupta.

Mara returned to the human world where he prostrated before the monk and repented. At Upagupta's recommendation, he vowed never to do harm to the Dharma and took refuge in the Three Jewels.

The former source includes a gatha that Mara recited when his suffering was lifted:

Adoration to the Master of the three samādhis,
To the sage disciple of the ten powers.
Today I wish to turn to him
Without countenancing the existence
Of any meanness or weakness.

In popular culture

Mara has been prominently featured in the Megami Tensei video game series as a demon. Within the series, Mara is portrayed as a large, phallic creature, often shown riding a golden chariot. His phallic body and innuendo-laden speech are based on a pun surrounding the word mara, a Japonic word for "penis" that is attested as early as 938 CE in the Wamyō Ruijushō, a Japanese dictionary of Chinese characters. According to the Sanseido dictionary, the word was originally used as a euphemism for "penis" among Buddhist monks, which references sensual lust as an obstacle to enlightenment.

The villain of the Doctor Who serial Kinda and Snakedance was the Mara.

Mara appears in Roger Zelazny's novel Lord of Light as a god of illusion.

In 2020, the singer-songwriter Jack Garratt released a song entitled "Mara". Inspired by the story of Mara’s distraction of the Buddha, "Mara" describes Garratt's experience of intrusive thoughts.

See also
 Demiurge
 Eros
 Grīmekhalaṃ
 Kamadeva
 Mare
 Marzanna
 Mors (mythology)
 Thanatos
 Anubis
 Izanami
 Hades
 Ah Puch
 Id, ego and super-ego
 Temptation of Christ and Temptation of St. Anthony (similar themes in Christianity)
 Maravijaya Buddha (A Buddharupa attitude depicting the scene against Mara)
Indiana Jones Adventure (A dark-ride at Disneyland and Tokyo DisneySea)
 Mayasura

Notes

Sources
 Bodhi, Bhikkhu (trans.) (2000). The Connected Discourses of the Buddha: A Translation of the Samyutta Nikaya. Boston: Wisdom Pubs. .
 Saddhatissa, H. (translator) (1998). The Sutta-Nipāta. London: RoutledgeCurzon Press. .

Further reading
 
 
 Ling, Trevor O. (1962). Buddhism and the Mythology of Evil: A Study in Theravada Buddhism. London: Allen and Unwin

External links
 The Buddha's Encounters with Mara the Tempter: Their Representation in Literature and Art
 Taming the Mara
 Mara, the Evil One_99

Demons in Buddhism
Buddhism and death
Destroyer gods
Evil gods